The Sweetheart of Sigma Chi is a 1933 American comedy film directed by Edwin L. Marin and written by Luther Reed and Albert DeMond. The film stars Mary Carlisle, Buster Crabbe, Charles Starrett, Florence Lake, Eddie Tamblyn and Sally Starr. The film was released on October 26, 1933, by Monogram Pictures.

Plot

Cast          
Mary Carlisle as Vivian
Buster Crabbe as Bob North
Charles Starrett as Morley
Florence Lake as Dizzy
Eddie Tamblyn as Harry
Sally Starr as Madge
Mary Blackford as Bunny
Tom Dugan as Trainer 
Burr McIntosh as Professor
Major Goodsell as Coach
Grady Sutton as Pledge
Purnell Pratt as Doctor
Franklin Parker as House Prexy

References

External links
 

1933 films
1933 comedy films
American black-and-white films
American comedy films
1930s English-language films
Films about fraternities and sororities
Films directed by Edwin L. Marin
Films set in universities and colleges
Monogram Pictures films
Sigma Chi
1930s American films